"Mama Don't Forget to Pray for Me" is a song written by Larry Cordle and Larry Shell, and recorded by American country music group Diamond Rio.  It was released in November 1991 as the third single from their self-titled album.  It peaked at number 9 in both the United States and Canada.

Content
The narrator is having a hard time in his life, and asks his mother to not forget to pray for him.

Music video
The music video was directed by Michael Merriman, and features the band playing at an airport and in a room somewhere.

Chart performance

Year-end charts

References

1992 singles
Diamond Rio songs
Songs written by Larry Cordle
Arista Nashville singles
Songs written by Larry Shell
1991 songs